It Came from Somewhere Else is a 1988 motion picture comedy directed by Howard Hassler. It is a spoof of sci-fi films and is a B-movie.
Kung fu aliens from space have invaded the small town of Grand Bosh, accompanied by a surge of spontaneous human combustion and other mysterious phenomena in this awkward spoof of 1950s sci-fi.

Cast
 William Vanarsdale as Sheriff Ed Munchinson
 Don Aldrich as Deputy Don
 Robert Buckley as Doc Savel
 Allen M. Johnson as Joe Drunk
 Richard Speeter as Mr. Buckner
 George Carlson as Mayor Shrank
 Paul Zdechlik as Wendell Shrank
 Jane Rudowski as Julie Buckner
 Terry Royalty as Cindy
 Larry Sutin as Art Rumbo
 Mike McDonough as Morgan McDougal
 Joseph Hautman as Smith Ambrose
 Robert L. Speeter as The President
 John Bruhn as Fred O'Wardy / Mac
 Jerry Trigg as Don Fuller

External links 
 

1988 films
American comedy films
1988 comedy films
Spontaneous human combustion in fiction
1980s English-language films
1980s American films